Ray Jacques Bassil (born 20 October 1988) is a Lebanese trap shooter. She won gold at the 2016 ISSF World Cup in Nicosia, and at the 2019 Asian Shooting Championships in Doha. Bassil has also three times represented Lebanon at the Olympic Games, in 2012, 2016 and 2020.

Career 
Bassil started trap-shooting aged eight, encouraged by her father Jacques. She began her competitive career in 2006. In 2007, Bassil won her first medal at the ISSF Junior World Championships held in Nicosia, Cyprus, winning bronze. She represented Lebanon at the 2012 Summer Olympics in London, finishing 18th, and at the 2016 Summer Olympics in Rio de Janeiro, where she finished 14th.

Bassil won her first career gold medal at the 2016 ISSF World Cup held in Nicosia. With her gold medal win at the 2019 Asian Shooting Championships in Doha, Qatar, she qualified to the 2020 Summer Olympics in Tokyo. Bassil was Lebanon's flag bearer at the 2020 Olympics; she finished the women's trap event in 21st place.

Personal life 
Bassil graduated with a bachelor's degree in Food and Beverage Management from Notre Dame University–Louaize. She speaks three languages: Arabic, English and French.

Olympic results

References

External links
 

Living people
Lebanese female sport shooters
1988 births
People from Keserwan District
Olympic shooters of Lebanon
Shooters at the 2012 Summer Olympics
Shooters at the 2016 Summer Olympics
Shooters at the 2006 Asian Games
Shooters at the 2010 Asian Games
Shooters at the 2014 Asian Games
Shooters at the 2018 Asian Games
Asian Games medalists in shooting
Asian Games bronze medalists for Lebanon
Medalists at the 2018 Asian Games
Shooters at the 2020 Summer Olympics
20th-century Lebanese women
21st-century Lebanese women